Naklo is a small village in the Municipality of Divača in the Littoral region of Slovenia.

Mass grave
Naklo is the site of a mass grave associated with the Second World War. The Preval Cave 2 Mass Grave—also known as the Big Preval Cave Mass Grave or Fly Cave Mass Grave—is located on the edge of the woods southwest of Matavun. It contains the remains of Slovene civilians and was discovered in 1982.

References

External links
Naklo on Geopedia

Populated places in the Municipality of Divača